Ireland is an unincorporated community in Lewis County, West Virginia, United States.  The community was named after Ireland, the ancestral home of a first settler.

Ireland is also the American home of the sport of Irish Road Bowling.

Climate
The climate in this area has mild differences between highs and lows, and there is adequate rainfall year-round.  According to the Köppen Climate Classification system, Ireland has a marine west coast climate, abbreviated "Cfb" on climate maps.

References

Irish-American culture in West Virginia
Unincorporated communities in Lewis County, West Virginia
Unincorporated communities in West Virginia